Marea de Vigo (Tide of Vigo in Galician language) is a left-wing citizen movement and political alliance active in the city of Vigo

History

Marea de Vigo was created as a left-wing "popular unity" candidacy to the municipal elections of May 2015.

Rubén Pérez Correa, a member of the United Left (EU) was elected as the candidate. The candidacy is supported by EU, Anova-Nationalist Brotherhood, independents and some members of Podemos. It's one of the many "popular unity" candidacies formed by left-wing political parties in Galicia and Spain to the Spanish local elections, 2015; like Marea Atlántica, Ahora Madrid, Barcelona en Comú, Zaragoza en Común or Málaga Ahora.

Marea de Vigo was the 3rd most voted list in the Vigo local elections of 2015 (16,227 votes, 11.5%), gaining 3 seats in the city council.

Elected councillors (2019-2023)
 Rubén Pérez Correa: member of United Left and local coordinator of the party.
 Oriana Méndez Fuentes: member of Anova-Nationalist Brotherhood and the Galician People's Front.

Electoral results

References

External links
Official website
Official Twitter

2014 establishments in Galicia (Spain)
Political parties established in 2014
Political party alliances in Spain
Socialist parties in Galicia (Spain)
United Left (Spain)
Podemos (Spanish political party)